Grassobbio (Bergamasque:  or ) is a municipality (comune) in the Province of Bergamo, which consists of 6487 of inhabitants, in the Italian region of Lombardy. Grassobbio is located in the orographical right side of Serio river and around 8.5km far from the main city of Bergamo.

Grassobbio borders the following municipalities: Cavernago, Orio al Serio, Seriate, Zanica.

Economy
In the mid 70’s, the now multinational chemical manufacturer Sigma Chemicals Company built its second plant in Grassobbio, after starting in Mozzo.

References